Nicole Cliffe (born September 2, 1982) is a Canadian writer living in Utah, who co-founded and co-edited the website The Toast with Daniel Lavery.

Early life 
Nicole Cliffe was born September 2, 1982 and grew up in Kingston, Ontario. A first-generation college student, she attended Harvard College on a full scholarship, studying English. She graduated in 2005. At Harvard, her friends included future journalists Amelia Lester, Matthew Yglesias, and Josh Barro.

Career

Early career 
Cliffe worked at a New York hedge fund before becoming a writer. She drew attention for a Tumblr entitled Lazy Self-Indulgent Book Reviews as well as a recurring book review column on The Awl called "Classic Trash". In June 2011 Cliffe joined the Awl-network women's general interest site The Hairpin, where she became book editor. Through this work, Cliffe met future collaborator Daniel Lavery, first over the internet, then later in person.

The Toast 

Cliffe and Lavery left The Hairpin in 2013 to found a separate feminist general interest website The Toast, which Cliffe and Lavery co-edited, later adding Nicole Chung as managing editor and Jaya Saxena as a staff writer. (Lawyer Nick Pavich was originally the publisher and one-third owner of the site, but departed in the winter of 2013–2014). Cliffe and her husband funded the site's launch. The Toast published from July 1, 2013, until July 1, 2016. From October 15, 2014, to September 2015, the project also included a sister site called The Butter; led by Roxane Gay, The Butter focused on personal essays and cultural criticism. The Toast made a one-day return with new material on July 26, 2017.

Writing and other projects 
In addition to her editing and book reviews, Cliffe has drawn notice for her writing on a wide range of topics, including humor pieces, collegiate financial aid, and Protestant Christianity. She has written advice columns for Elle and Catapult's magazine, and in January 2018, became an advice columnist, with Carvell Wallace, at Slate. Their column, offering parenting advice, is called "Care and Feeding". She left Slate in 2020.

In December 2017, Cliffe joined the board of directors of Electric Literature.

In October 2019, Cliffe was credited as an executive producer for the documentary "The Acid King", based on the non-fiction book of the same name about the life of Ricky Kasso.

In June 2020, Cliffe told Vox she was writing a horror novel, which she later confirmed via Twitter.

Personal life 
Cliffe lives in Utah with her husband and three children. An atheist since college, she converted to Christianity in 2015. She is autistic, as is one of her children.

References

External links
 Slate
 Nicole Knows
 The Toast

1982 births
Living people
Journalists from Ontario
Canadian emigrants to the United States
Writers from Kingston, Ontario
Canadian arts journalists
Canadian feminist writers
Canadian satirists
Converts to Protestantism from atheism or agnosticism
Harvard College alumni
Writers from Utah
Canadian editors
Canadian women editors
Canadian women journalists
People on the autism spectrum
Canadian Christians